The Hammocks is a planned community and census-designated place in Miami-Dade County, Florida, United States. The population was 59,480 at the 2020 census, up from 51,003 in 2010.

Geography

The CDP and planned community encompass the area west of SW 137th Avenue, south of SW 88th Street, east of SW 177 Ave, and north of SW 120th St. It is bordered to the east by The Crossings and to the north by Kendall West and Kendale Lakes.

Government and infrastructure
The Miami-Dade Police Department operates the Hammocks District Station in The Hammocks.

Education
Public education in The Hammocks is serviced by the Miami-Dade County Public Schools system.

Elementary schools
Claude Pepper Elementary School
Gilbert L. Porter Elementary School
Oliver Hoover Elementary School
Christina M. Eve Elementary School

Middle school
Hammocks Middle School

High school
Felix Varela High School

Private school
Archbishop Coleman F. Carroll High School
Our Lady of Lourdes Parish School - Established in 1997.

Demographics

2020 census

As of the 2020 United States census, there were 59,480 people, 19,617 households, and 16,685 families residing in the CDP.

2010 census

As of 2010, there were 17,565 households, with 6.7% being vacant. As of 2000, there were 15,203 households, out of which 46.5% had children under the age of 18 living with them, 58.4% were married couples living together, 16.1% had a female householder with no husband present, and 20.7% were non-families. 15.1% of all households were made up of individuals, and 1.8% had someone living alone who was 65 years of age or older. The average household size was 3.10 and the average family size was 3.47.

2000 census
In 2000, the CDP the population was spread out, with 28.3% under the age of 18, 10.3% from 18 to 24, 36.2% from 25 to 44, 18.9% from 45 to 64, and 6.3% who were 65 years of age or older. The median age was 32 years. For every 100 females, there were 90.3 males. For every 100 females age 18 and over, there were 86.5 males.

In 2000, the median income for a household in the CDP was $50,909, and the median income for a family was $54,444. Males had a median income of $35,159 versus $30,178 for females. The per capita income for the CDP was $18,962. About 7.0% of families and 8.6% of the population were below the poverty line, including 8.6% of those under age 18 and 11.3% of those age 65 or over.

As of 2000, speakers of Spanish as a first language accounted for 71.34% of residents, while English made up 22.82%, French was at 1.21%, French Creole at 0.94%, Portuguese 0.83%, and Arabic was 0.54% of the population. Tagalog made up 0.49% of the population.

As of 2000, The Hammocks had the third-highest percentage of Colombian residents in the US, with 10.02% of the populace. It had the twenty-eighth-highest percentage of Cuban residents in the US, at 17.59% of the population, the fifth-highest percentage of Peruvians in the US, at 3.36%, and the third-highest percentage of Venezuelan residents in the US, at 3.14% of its population (tied with Fontainebleau). It also had the thirteenth-most Nicaraguans in the US, at 2.88%, while it had the fifty-fifth-highest percentage of Dominicans, at 2.46% of all residents, while the Ecuadorian community had the fifty-fifth-highest percentage of residents, which was at 1.10% of the population.

References

Census-designated places in Miami-Dade County, Florida
Census-designated places in Florida
Planned communities in Florida